Kentucky Route 3524 (KY 3524) is an urban secondary state route located entirely in Metcalfe County in South Central Kentucky. It runs between U.S. Route 68 (US 68) and KY 80 on the north side of Edmonton, providing access to the city's industrial park. For the benefit of truck drivers hauling cargo to and from the city's factories, KY 3524 is mentioned on exit 30 signage along the nearby Cumberland Parkway between mile markers 28 and 32.

Major intersections

References

3524
3524